Lake of the Woods 31H is a First Nations reserve on Big Island in Lake of the Woods, northwestern Ontario. It is one of the reserves of the Anishnaabeg of Naongashiing.

External links
 Aboriginal Affairs and Northern Development Canada profile

Anishinaabe reserves in Ontario
Communities in Rainy River District